Ángel Núñez is a Paraguayan football defender who plays for Club R.I.3 Corrales in the Paraguayan División Intermedia.

Career

Cerro Porteño PF
Núñez was part of the squads at Cerro Porteño PF. During the 2013 Primera División Paraguaya season, he appeared for the club's reserve-team. In 2014 División Intermedia season, Núñez formed part of the club's first-team. In 2015, he was part of the Cerro Porteño PF squad which reached the play-off stages of the Primera B Nacional.

3 de Febrero
For the 2016 División Intermedia season, Núnez joined Ciudad del Este team 3 de Febrero. On 17 February, Diario Vanguardia announced him in the squad list for the 2016 season. In April, Núñez appeared as a substitute in the second half of a 4–1 win against Sportivo San Lorenzo. In August, Núñez was in the starting line up in a 2–1 home defeat against Resistencia. In September, Núñez started in a 1–0 home defeat against Deportivo Caaguazú and was replaced by Adolfo Miño in the 79th minute.

R.I.3 Corrales
On 18 March 2018, Núnez made his first league appearance in a 2–1 away victory against Resistencia.

References

Living people
Paraguayan footballers
Association footballers not categorized by position
Year of birth missing (living people)